A Place in the Sun is the fifth studio album by American country music artist Tim McGraw. It was released on May 4, 1999. "Please Remember Me" was nominated for Best Male Country Vocal Performance at the 2000 Grammy Awards. "My Best Friend" was nominated in the same category the following year. The album’s compact disc version was originally available with a limited edition booklet that contained two transparent sleeves inside. Subsequent releases have all the same information, though without the transparent pages.

This album produced the singles "Please Remember Me", "Something Like That", "My Best Friend", "My Next Thirty Years" and "Some Things Never Change"; "Please Remember Me" was originally recorded by Rodney Crowell on his 1995 album Jewel of the South, and was a #69 country hit for him that year. Except for the #7-peaking "Some Things Never Change", all the singles on this album reached number one on the Hot Country Songs charts; "Seventeen" and "Señorita Margarita" also reached the lower regions of that chart from unsolicited airplay.

Track listing

"Please Remember Me (Pop Version)"  – 4:30
Track 1 on Japanese version

Personnel

Musicians
 Tim McGraw – lead vocals 
 Steve Nathan – keyboards
 Larry Byrom – acoustic guitar
 Biff Watson – acoustic guitar
 Mike Durham – electric guitar
 Michael Landau – electric guitar
 B. James Lowry – electric guitar
 Brent Mason – electric guitar
 John Willis – electric guitar
 Dan Dugmore – steel guitar 
 Paul Franklin – steel guitar
 Mike Brignardello – bass
 Glenn Worf – bass
 Lonnie Wilson – drums
 Glen Duncan – fiddle
 Aubrey Haynie – fiddle
 Bergen White – string arrangements and conductor (8, 10, 14)
 Carl Gorodetzky – string contractor (8, 10, 14)
 The Nashville String Machine – strings (8, 10, 14)
 Greg Barnhill – backing vocals
 Kim Carnes – backing vocals (8)
 Patty Loveless – backing vocals (10)
 Kim Parent – backing vocals
 Chris Rodriguez – backing vocals
 Curtis Wright – backing vocals
 Curtis Young – backing vocals

Production
 Byron Gallimore – producer 
 Tim McGraw – producer, creative director 
 James Stroud – producer
 Rich Hanson – engineer 
 Julian King – tracking engineer
 Ricky Cobble – second tracking engineer 
 Jed Hackett – second tracking engineer 
 Glenn Spinner – second tracking engineer 
 Aaron Swihart – second tracking engineer 
 Russ Martin – string engineer (8, 10, 14)
 Amy Hughes-Frigo – second string engineer (8, 10, 14)
 Rob MacMillan – second string engineer (8, 10, 14)
 Dennis Davis – overdub engineer, vocal tracking, digital editing
 Erik Lutkins – overdub engineer, vocal tracking, digital editing
 John Van Nest – digital editing 
 Chris Lord-Alge – mixing 
 Mike Dy – mix assistant 
 Rob Hoffman – mix assistant
 Doug Sax – mastering 
 Ann Callis – production assistant 
 Doug Rich – production assistant 
 Missi Gallimore – song assistant 
 Michelle Metzger – song assistant 
 Kelly Wright – creative director 
 Glenn Sweitzer – art direction, design 
 Russ Harrington – photography

Studios
 Additional recording at Essential Sound Studios (Houston, Texas); The Tracking Room and Loud Recording (Nashville, Tennessee); Studio 56 (Hollywood, California)
 Mixed at Image Recording Studios (Los Angeles, California)
 Mastered at The Mastering Lab (Hollywood, California)

Chart performance

Weekly charts

Year-end charts

Singles

Certifications

References

1999 albums
Tim McGraw albums
Curb Records albums
Albums produced by Byron Gallimore
Albums produced by James Stroud
Albums produced by Tim McGraw